Aeropus I was king of the ancient Greek kingdom of Macedonia. He was a member of the Argead dynasty and son of Philip I. By allowing thirty years for the span of an average generation from the beginning of Archelaus' reign in 413 BC, British historian Nicholas Hammond estimated that Aeropus ruled around 563 BC.

Reign 
At the start of Aeropus's reign, the Thracians and Illyrians were ravaging the country of Macedon, and had achieved a number of successful victories over the Macedonians. Eventually, despairing about their inability to achieve a victory over their enemies, and believing that they could only be victorious if they fought in the presence of their king, the army carried the infant Aeropus with them into battle. His presence stiffened the resistance of the soldiers, and they forced the Thracians and Illyrians to flee, eventually retreating entirely from Macedon.

According to Plutarch, Aeropus constructed tables and lamp-stands in his spare time. 

No further details of his reign are recorded.

His wife's name is unknown.

References

Notes

Citations

7th-century BC Macedonian monarchs
6th-century BC Macedonian monarchs
Argead kings of Macedonia
Year of birth unknown